The Grenoble Observatory for Sciences of the Universe (OSUG) is an astronomical observatory in France that is attached to CNRS-INSU  and Grenoble Alpes University. 

OSUG engages in scientific studies related to all aspects of the universe, the earth and environmental systems. The OSUG federates 1100 personals in 6 research Units, 5 Associated Research Teams and 2 joint service units federated, mostly located on the Saint-Martin d'Hères Campus near Grenoble.

OSUG was created on 26 November by governmental decree n° 85-1243.

Research fields and Observation services 
OSUG federates six research units (ISTerre, IPAG, IGE, LEGI, LECA, Irstea Grenoble), five associated research teams (FAME/ESRF, CEN/CNRM, Environnements/PACTE, SigmaPhy/Gipsa-Lab, LAME/LIPhy) and two joint service units (UMS OSUG, SAJF). OSUG engages in scientific studies in astrophysics, planetary science, geophysics, geology, climatology, hydrology, glaciology and ecology.

OSUG manages a number of key Observing systems, which contribute to national and international databases. Finally, OSUG, within the University of Grenoble, plays a major role in defining and running higher education programs and provides initial and continuing education in Earth Sciences, sciences of the Universe and environmental sciences.

The OSUG permanent exhibition opened in 2016).

References

 Official website

Science and technology in Grenoble
Astrophysics institutes
Research institutes in France